Government School Teachers Association, Delhi (GSTA) is a teachers' union recognized by the Delhi Government, India, which represents teachers serving under the Delhi Government. The current elected General Secretary of GSTA is Ajay Veer Yadav. Master Azad Singh, ex-Mayor, North Delhi MCD contested in these elections. Teacher groups actively contributing in the functioning of GSTA include Adhyapak Shakti Manch.

References 

 Education in Delhi